Bo Börjesson (born 01 December 1949) is a former Swedish football player.

During his club career, Börjesson played for Örgryte IS and IFK Sundsvall.

Börjesson made 23 appearances for the Sweden national football team between 1976 and 1981, scoring 5 goals.

External links

1949 births
Swedish footballers
Sweden international footballers
Örgryte IS players
IFK Sundsvall players
Association football midfielders
Living people